Khalil Rza Uluturk, (21 October 1932, Salyan – 22 June 1994, Baku) was an Azerbaijani poet.

Education and career
In 1954, he graduated from the Department of Journalism at Azerbaijan State University (currently Baku State University). He attended courses for two years studying Literature for Writers and Poets at the Institute of Literature named after Maxim Gorky. Upon graduation, he worked at Azerbaijani Woman magazine. Khalil Rza obtained his Doctor of Philology Sciences in 1985. From 1969 until his death, he worked at the Institute of Literature in Baku.

In January 1990, Khalil Rza was arrested as a leader of Azerbaijani National Movement against the Soviet Union and was imprisoned for 22 months in the notorious Lefortovo prison in Moscow. During the First Nagorno-Karabakh War, his son Tabriz was killed in fighting on the frontline.

List of works
Khalil Rza published about 35 books (about 20 during his lifetime, and the remainder when his wife collected his writings and published them). His most well-known books include:
Məhəbbət dastanı (Poem of Love, 1961)
Ucalıq (Prestige, 1973)
Hara gedir bu dunya? (Where is this World Going? 1983)
Davam edir '37 (1937 Still Lives On, 1991)
Ayla günəş arasında (Between the Sun and Moon, 1992)
Mən şərqəm (I am the East, 1994)

Recognition
In 1992, Khalil Rza was awarded the title of People's Poet of Azerbaijan and in 1995, he was posthumously awarded the Independence Order (Istiglal Ordeni).
Khalil Rza died in Baku and is buried in the Cemetery of the Honored Ones (Fakhri Khiyaban).

References

External links
Poems by Khalil Rza Uluturk, Azerbaijan International Magazine

1932 births
1994 deaths
Azerbaijani poets
People from Salyan District (Azerbaijan)
Recipients of the Istiglal Order
20th-century poets